David or Dave Pearson may refer to:
 David Pearson (librarian) (born 1955), British librarian and scholar 
 David Pearson (racing driver) (1934–2018), American car racing champion
 David Pearson (scientist) (born 1942), Canadian scientist, academic and television personality
 Dave Pearson (American football) (born 1981), American offensive lineman
 Dave Pearson (painter) (1937–2008), English artist
 Dave Pearson (pool player), British speed pool champion and multiple Guinness Book world record holder
 Dave Pearson (rugby union) (born 1966), English rugby union referee
 David Lee Pearson (born 1974), Paralympic athlete
 Dave Pearson (footballer) (born 1932), Scottish footballer
 David Pearson (cricketer) (born 1963), former English cricketer
 David Pearson (bowls), Scottish lawn bowler
 David Pearson (social care administrator), chair of the UK government's Social Care Sector COVID-19 Support Taskforce since 2020